Cigaritis baghirmii is a butterfly in the family Lycaenidae. It is found in Chad.

References

Butterflies described in 1946
Cigaritis